The second-generation Nexus 7, also commonly referred to as the Nexus 7 (2013), is a mini tablet computer co-developed by Google and Asus that runs the Android operating system. It is the second of three tablets in the Google Nexus tablet series (Nexus 7 (2012), this Nexus 7 (2013), and the Nexus 9), the Nexus family including both phones and tablets running essentially stock Android which were originally marketed for developer testing but later marketed by Google to consumers as well, all of which were built by various original equipment manufacturer partners. Following the success of the original Nexus 7, this second generation of the device was released on July 26, 2013, four days earlier than the originally scheduled date due to early releases from various retailers. The tablet was the first device to ship with Android 4.3.

The second iteration of the  tablet, code named "Razor", has various upgrades from the previous generation, including a 1.5 GHz quad-core Snapdragon S4 Pro processor, 2 GB of RAM, a  pixel display (323 pixels per inch; 127px/cm), dual cameras (1.2 MP front, 5 MP rear), stereo speakers, built-in inductive Qi wireless charging, and a SlimPort (via micro USB connector) capable of full high-definition video output to an external display.

Features

Software
Nexus 7 was the first device to be shipped with Android 4.3 "Jelly Bean". All Nexus devices, including the Nexus 7, run a version of Android free of manufacturer or wireless carrier modifications (e.g., custom graphical user interfaces or 'skins' such as TouchWiz and HTC Sense) commonly included on other Android devices. Nexus products also feature an unlockable bootloader, which enabled "rooting" the device, thereby enabling user access to privileged control over the Android environment, which in turn enables further development or modification of the operating system or replacement of the device's firmware. An update to Android 4.4 was released in November 2013, followed by another update to Android 4.4.2 one month later and eventually an update to Android 4.4.3 in June 2014 and 4.4.4 in July. The Wi-Fi only variant of the Nexus 7 was one of the two devices of which the Android L developer preview was officially available for, with the other being the Nexus 5. Android 5.0 "Lollipop" was released in November 2014 for the Wi-Fi only version. In July 2015, Android 5.1.1 was rolled out to the Nexus 7, containing a fix for the Stagefright bug.

In November 2015, Nexus 7 started receiving Android 6.0 "Marshmallow" update across the world. Following which Nexus 7 became one of the first devices to get an Android 6.0.1 Marshmallow update in December 2015. The Nexus 7 (2013) will not receive an official Android 7.0 "Nougat" update, meaning that Android 6.0.1 Marshmallow is the last officially supported Android version for the device.

In December 2020, LineageOS announced official builds of LineageOS 17.1 (a distribution of Android 10 "Q") for the Nexus 7. These require repartitioning the internal eMMC due to the outdated and small partition sizes that the device comes with, and the increasing sizes of modern Android versions. It is currently the only major supported operating system for the device, as Android 6.0.1 (the last version of Android that Google supplied the system with) has not received security patches since September 2018.

Hardware and design
The Nexus 7 (ASUS-1A005A) is both thinner and lighter than its predecessor. It is manufactured by Asus, and comes with a Qualcomm Snapdragon S4 Pro APQ8064–1AA SoC, (1.5 GHz quad-core Krait 300 and an Adreno 320 GPU, clocked at 400 MHz). The new Nexus 7's SoC is believed to be a variation of Qualcomm's Snapdragon 600 processor (branded as "S4 Pro") underclocked to 1.5 GHz. It has 2GB of RAM (doubling that of the previous generation) and is available with either 16GB or 32GB of internal flash memory storage. Like all other current-generation Google Nexus devices, there is no option for additional storage via micro SD expansion card.  The Nexus 7 2013 natively supports OTG cable micro USB to USB flash drives, and USB SD card readers via the Nexus Media Importer for read/write (including NTFS formats).
The battery is reported to last up to 9 hours of HD video playback and 10 hours of web browsing or e-reading. The battery's capacity has been lowered from 4,325 mAh in the 2012 Nexus 7, to 3,950 mAh in the 2013 version. Despite this reduction, battery life typically exceeds that of the original due to hardware and software optimizations.

Additionally, the panel's contrast ratio and color gamut are reportedly superior to the previous model.

The Nexus 7 was initially only available in black, but in December 2013 a white option was added.

Model variants

Reception
The reviews of the second-generation Nexus 7 have been highly favorable with many reviewers claiming it to be the best 7-inch tablet in the market. Reviewers praised the device for its size, design, display, price, inclusion of a rear-facing camera, contemporary user interface and the growing number of tablet-optimized Android applications. It has been praised for being a notable improvement over its predecessor. The device competes with iPad Mini, Kindle Fire HDX and Samsung Galaxy Tab 3 7.0.

Despite the age of the Nexus 7, in June 2018 it was still the fourth most popular tablet in use around the world.

See also

 Comparison of tablet computers

References
Footnotes

External links

 – official Asus site
 - official site
Detailed comparison: Google Nexus 7 (2013) vs. Google Nexus 7 (2012)
Detailed comparison: Google Nexus 7 LTE (2013) vs. Google Nexus 7 3G (2012)
Nexus 7 WiFi (2013) System Information and benchmark results

Tablet computers
Android (operating system) devices
Tablet computers introduced in 2013
Google Nexus
Asus products
Portable media players
Ubuntu Touch devices